The 1981 Alabama Crimson Tide football team (variously "Alabama", "UA" or "Bama") represented the University of Alabama in the 1981 NCAA Division I-A football season. It was the Crimson Tide's 87th overall and 48th season as a member of the Southeastern Conference (SEC). The team was led by head coach Bear Bryant, in his 24th year, and played their home games at Bryant–Denny Stadium in Tuscaloosa and Legion Field in Birmingham, Alabama. They finished season with nine wins, two losses and one tie (9–2–1 overall, 6–0 in the SEC), as SEC co-champions with Georgia and with a loss against Texas in the Cotton Bowl.

Alabama recovered from an upset loss to a 1–10 Georgia Tech team to win its ninth SEC title in eleven years (shared with Georgia). It was Bama's 18th SEC championship, and the 13th and last conference title for Paul "Bear" Bryant at Alabama.  Alabama's 28–17 win over Auburn was Coach Bryant's 315th career victory, breaking the then all-time record held by Amos Alonzo Stagg. Alabama's Cotton Bowl Classic loss to Texas dropped the Tide's all-time record against the Longhorns to 0–7–1.

Schedule

Notes

References
General

 
 

Specific

Alabama
Alabama Crimson Tide football seasons
Southeastern Conference football champion seasons
Alabama Crimson Tide football